Cumberland County Schools (CCS) is a school district encompassing the entirety of Cumberland County, North Carolina, United States.

Cumberland County Schools' headquarters are located in Fayetteville, North Carolina. Cumberland County Schools has schools located in all cities and towns of Cumberland County. Cumberland County Schools is the 4th largest school system in the state and 78 in the country. The district serves most areas for grades PK-12. The Department of Defense Education Activity (DoDEA) operates public schools on Fort Bragg for PK-8, but for high school Fort Bragg students attend local public schools in their respective counties.

Student enrollment
Cumberland County Schools has a total of 53,000 enrolled students, including 1000 preschool students, 24,000 elementary students, 12,000 middle school students, and 16,000 high school students. The district employs 3,500 teachers and a total of 6,800 employees.

About half of the students in the district are Black, with about 40% White, and all other races making up less than 10% of enrollment.

Cumberland County Schools is broken into 10 attendance areas, although as a "school of choice", school system, students may attend any school in a district that offers the program, so long as they have transportation to and from school and are approved through an application process. Students from Hope Mills may attend Grays Creek High School, even if they live in the South View High School District, so long as they provide their own transportation.

Schools

High Schools

A.B. Wilkins High School, Fayetteville
Cape Fear High School, Vander
Cross Creek Early College High School, Fayetteville
Cumberland International Early College High School, Fayetteville
Cumberland Polytechnic High School, Fayetteville
Douglas Byrd High School, Fayetteville
E. E. Smith High School, Fayetteville
Gray's Creek High School, Hope Mills
Jack Britt High School, Fayetteville
Massey Hill Classical High School, Fayetteville
Pine Forest High School, Fayetteville
Ramsey Street High School, Fayetteville
Reid Ross Classical Middle/High School, Fayetteville
Seventy-First High School, Fayetteville
South View High School, Hope Mills
Terry Sanford High School, Fayetteville
Westover High School, Fayetteville

Middle Schools

Anne Chestnutt Middle School, Fayetteville
Douglas Byrd Middle School, Fayetteville
Gray's Creek Middle School, Hope Mills
Hope Mills Middle School, Hope Mills
Howard Learning Academy, Fayetteville
John R. Griffin Middle School, Fayetteville
Lewis Chapel Middle School, Fayetteville
Luther Jeralds Middle School, Fayetteville
Mac Williams Middle School, Fayetteville
Max Abbott Middle School, Fayetteville
New Century International Middle School, Fayetteville
Pine Forest Middle School, Fayetteville
Reid Ross Classical Middle/High School, Fayetteville
Seventy-First Classical Middle School, Fayetteville
South View Middle School, Hope Mills
Spring Lake Middle School, Spring Lake
Westover Middle School, Fayetteville

Elementary Schools

Alderman Road Elementary School, Fayetteville
Armstrong Elementary School, Eastover
Ashley Elementary School, Fayetteville
Beaver Dam Elementary School, Roseboro
Ben Martin Elementary School, Fayetteville
Bill Hefner Elementary School, Fayetteville
Brentwood Elementary School, Fayetteville
C. Wayne Collier Elementary School, Hope Mills
Cliffdale Elementary School, Fayetteville
College Lakes Elementary School, Fayetteville
Cumberland Mills Elementary School, Fayetteville
Cumberland Road Elementary School, Fayetteville
District 7 Elementary School, Wade
E.E. Miller Elementary School, Fayetteville
E. Melvin Honeycutt Elementary School, Fayetteville
Ed V. Baldwin Elementary School, Hope Mills
Eastover-Central Elementary School, Eastover
Elizabeth Cashwell Elementary School, Fayetteville
Ferguson-Easley Elementary School, Fayetteville
Gallberry Farm Elementary School, Hope Mills
Glendale Acres Elementary School, Fayetteville
Gray's Creek Elementary School, Fayetteville
Howard Hall Elementary School, Fayetteville
J.W. Coon Elementary School, Fayetteville
J.W. Seabrook Elementary School, Fayetteville
Lake Rim Elementary School, Fayetteville
Long Hill Elementary School, Fayetteville
Loyd Auman Elementary School, Fayetteville
Lucile Souders Elementary School, Fayetteville
Manchester Elementary School, Spring Lake
Margaret Willis Elementary School, Fayetteville
Mary McArthur Elementary School, Fayetteville
Montclair Elementary School, Fayetteville
Morganton Road Elementary School, Fayetteville
New Century International Elementary School, Fayetteville
Ponderosa Elementary School, Fayetteville
Raleigh Road Elementary School, Linden
Rockfish Elementary School, Hope Mills
Sherwood Park Elementary School, Fayetteville
Stedman Elementary School, Stedman
Stoney Point Elementary School, Fayetteville
Sunnyside Elementary School, Fayetteville
Vanstory Hills Elementary School, Fayetteville
William H. Owen Elementary School, Fayetteville
W.T. Brown Elementary School, Spring Lake
Walker-Spivey Elementary School, Fayetteville
Warrenwood Elementary School, Fayetteville
Westarea Elementary School, Fayetteville

Primary Schools

Alma Easom Primary School, Fayetteville
Stedman Primary School, Stedman

Alternative Schools
Cumberland Virtual Academy

References

External links
Cumberland County Schools
Cumberland County School Directory
2004-2005 NC Report Card for Cumberland County Schools

School districts in North Carolina
Education in Cumberland County, North Carolina
Education in Fayetteville, North Carolina